The Monte L. Bean Life Science Museum is a natural history museum housed at Brigham Young University (BYU) in Provo, Utah, United States.

Description

The museum is named for Monte Lafayette Bean, a self-made Seattle-based magnate who entirely funded and paid for the building's construction.  He also donated many of his own animal trophies to the collection.  The Bean Museum opened on March 28, 1978, and is accredited by the American Alliance of Museums. It maintains collections of vascular and non-vascular plants, and invertebrate and vertebrate animals.  Before 1978, it was known as the BYU Life Sciences Museum and did not have its own building. The Bean Museum now houses the Liger Shasta who lived at the Hogle Zoo from when she was born on May 6, 1948, till when she died, on July 12, 1972.

Admission to the three-story museum is free of charge and over 100,000 unique visitors come to see the over 2 million specimens of insects, plants, reptiles, fish, shells, and birds.

References

External links

 
M.L. Bean Museum records, MSS 1132 at L. Tom Perry Special Collections, Brigham Young University
Wilmer W. Tanner papers, including the records regarding the creation of and the endowment for the museum, MSS 7361 at L. Tom Perry Special Collections, Brigham Young University

Natural history museums in Utah
University museums in Utah
Brigham Young University buildings
Museums in Provo, Utah
Museums established in 1978
Institutions accredited by the American Alliance of Museums
1978 establishments in Utah